Rob Jovanovic is an author, most notable for his 2004 biography about the indie rock band Pavement, Perfect Sound Forever: The Story of Pavement. Jovanovic has also penned volumes on Beck, Richey Edwards of the Manic Street Preachers, Nirvana, Big Star, Kate Bush and R.E.M.

Books

 Adventures in Hifi: The Complete R.E.M. (2001) 
 Perfect Sound Forever: The Story of Pavement (2004) 
 Big Star: The Short Life, Painful Death, and Unexpected Resurrection of the Kings of Power Pop (2005) 
 Seeing The Light: Inside The Velvet Underground (2012) 
 God Save The Kinks (2013)

References 

American biographers
American male biographers
Living people
American writers about music
Year of birth missing (living people)